War of Words may refer to:

 War of Words (Fight album), 1993
 War of Words (Singers & Players album)
 War of Words, a JTBC TV show